Charlotte Anne Webb (born 26 February 1988), commonly known as Charley Webb, is an English actress. From 2002 to 2021, she portrayed the role of Debbie Dingle in the ITV soap opera Emmerdale. In 2014, she was nominated for Best Female Dramatic Performance at the British Soap Awards.

Career 
Before landing the role of Debbie, Webb previously appeared on the stage in Manchester in a production of Bugsy Malone when she was eight. She joined the soap opera Emmerdale in 2002 at the age of 14. She was nominated for Best Actress at the 2009 British Soap Awards and was also nominated for Sexiest Female at the 2010 British Soap Awards. In 2021, Webb announced that she had made the decision to leave Emmerdale after 19 years.

Personal life 
Webb attended Philips High School in Whitefield, Greater Manchester. She has two older sisters, and her older brother Jamie Lomas is an actor, known for playing Warren Fox in the Channel 4 soap opera, Hollyoaks. In September 2009, Webb and Emmerdale co-star Matthew Wolfenden announced that they were expecting their first child, due in spring 2010. Webb gave birth to a boy called Buster in April 2010. They announced in June 2015 that were having a second child, welcoming son Bowie on 19 December 2015. In February 2018, Webb and Wolfenden married; their co-star, Lucy Pargeter, was a bridesmaid. Webb announced her third pregnancy in February 2019, giving birth to a third son on 26 July 2019.

Filmography

Awards and nominations

References

External links 
 

1988 births
Living people
People from Bury, Greater Manchester
English soap opera actresses
English child actresses
21st-century English actresses